Xiamen University (Southern Min: Ē-mn̂g-toā-o̍h), colloquially known as Xia Da (Southern Min: Hā-tāi), is a national public research university in Xiamen, Fujian, China.

Founded in 1921 by Tan Kah Kee, a Chinese patriotic expatriate businessman in Singapore, the university has been perennially regarded as one of the top academic institutions in Southern China, with strengths in mathematics, chemistry, oceanography, economics, management, law, communication and political science.

Xiamen University is designated as a Class A Double First Class University of the national Double First Class University Plan, also a part of the former Project 985 and Project 211. As of 2020, the university hosts over 40,000 students on its 4 campuses and 6 academic divisions.

History

Private period 

In 1919, Tan Kah Kee, a Chinese expatriate in Singapore, businessman, investor, and philanthropist, donated then 4 million dollars to endow Amoy University in the city of Amoy (former romanization of 'Xiamen' until 1970s). When the university was founded in 1921, there were no more than 20 faculty members and just 98 students.

At the 1926 Sesquicentennial International Exposition in Philadelphia, United States, Amoy University was one of five institutions selected to participate in an exhibit on education in China, representing the country's higher education system.

National university period 
In 1937, Tan transferred administration of the university to the Nationalist government, and the institution became a national university.

In 1938, at the outbreak of the Second Sino-Japanese War, the university was temporarily relocated to Changting in western Fujian to escape Japanese invasion of Chinese coastal regions.

In 1946, after the war, the university moved back to Xiamen and resumed normal operations.

In 1952, it was transformed into a comprehensive university embracing both arts and science.

In 1963, it was designated as a key university in China.

In 1995, Xiamen University was selected to participate in the 211 Project, a Chinese government's initiative to provide increased financial resources for the country's most promising universities.

In 2000, the university was selected for the 985 Project, a national and local government initiative to provide funding for facilities construction and faculty hiring to bolster China's top universities.

On January 25, 2013, the Ministry of Higher Education of Malaysia submitted an invitation letter to Xiamen University to establish a branch campus in Malaysia.

On July 3, 2014, the foundation of Xiamen University Malaysia Campus was laid near Kuala Lumpur.

On February 22, 2016, Malaysia Campus officially opened.

In September 2017, the university was recognized as a Class A institution in the Double First Class University Plan, a Chinese government initiative to cultivate a group of elite Chinese universities into "world-class" institutions by 2050.

International cooperation 
Xiamen University has maintained a global presence since its creation in 1921, attracting students from overseas Chinese communities in Southeast Asia. The institution established an "Overseas Correspondence Courses" program in 1956 and accepted its first foreign students in 1981. Xiamen University now has an extensive portfolio of international collaborations, including an International Cooperative Program for Innovative Talents funded by the China Scholarship Council, 

and global exchange and cooperation relationships with over 300 universities. It has established 16 Confucius Institutes with partner institutions in 13 countries.

In 2011, Chinese Premier Wen Jiabao and Malaysian Prime Minister Najib Razak began high-level discussions about creating a Malaysian branch of Xiamen University. Subsequently, in 2015 the Xiamen University Malaysia Campus was established. Known as "XMU Malaysia", the institution has been described as "historic" and is notable as the "first ever large-scale international branch" of a Chinese university. Professor Wang Ruifang was named the first chancellor of XMU Malaysia.

On May 23, 2016, Xiamen University sent a delegation to the Tokyo Institute of Technology in Tokyo, Japan to meet with leadership and professors. The delegation's objective was to discuss the institutions' strategies for commercializing research findings, fostering university-industry collaboration, and encouraging international students to learn about local language and culture.

On November 18, 2016, Xiamen University and Cardiff University in Wales, United Kingdom initiated a "strategic partnership" including a program for co-supervision of doctoral students, and £1.2 million in seed funding for "collaborative research projects" to benefit the economy of Wales. Subsequently, a delegation from Cardiff University visited the Xiamen University School of International Relations to explore possible areas of research collaboration and student exchange.

In October 2018, Xiamen University hosted the 4th Internet+ Innovation and Entrepreneurship Competition.

Xiamen University also hosts recurring China study programs for University of North Carolina at Chapel Hill, Council for Christian Colleges and Universities, Eckerd College and Bentley College in USA, and University College Utrecht in the Netherlands.

Campuses

Main campus (Siming campus) 

The main campus of XMU is located in Siming District on Xiamen island, covering an area of 167 hectares. It is situated at the foothills of mountains, facing the ocean and surrounded by Xiamen bay. It mainly houses such academic divisions as the Humanities and Arts, Social Sciences, Natural Sciences, and Engineering and Technology.

The scope and level of its campus high-speed information network is rated first among all universities in China and has become one of the main nodes of CERNET2.

Haiyun campus 
The Haiyun Campus is part of the main campus, located near the Pearl Bay, south end of Xiamen, adjacent to Xiamen Software Park. The School of Software, School of Information Science and Technology, School of Mathematics Science are located in the campus.

Zhangzhou campus 
Zhangzhou Campus is located in Zhangzhou China Merchants Economic and Technological Development Zone (CMZD), Zhangzhou, covering an area of 171 hectares. It houses XMU Tan Kah Kee College, the Institute of Industrial Technology and other platforms for scientific and technological innovation.

Xiang'an campus 
In September 2012, Xiamen University began operations at its Xiang'an Campus, located 34 kilometers from the main campus. The three stated goals of the new campus are to provide facilities for "newly developing disciplines and applied subjects" such as bioscience and energy, to establish "innovation platforms for applied sciences", and to house the southern headquarters of the Confucius Institute.

Currently, the Xiang'an Campus hosts over 10,000 students and faculty from ten schools: the Overseas Education College (which serves international students), the Medical College, the School of Pharmaceutical Sciences, the School of Life Sciences, the School of Public Health, the Nursing Department, the College of Earth Sciences, the College of Environment and Ecology, the School of Energy Research, and the School of Aerospace Engineering.

Malaysia campus (XMUM) 

Upon the invitation of the Malaysian Ministry of Higher Education to set up a branch campus in Malaysia, Xiamen University accepted the offer and thus, Xiamen University Malaysia (XMUM) was born in 2015.

In keeping with the vision of our founder Mr. Tan Kah Kee, XMU began in earnest to build our first offshore campus in Malaysia and became the pioneer university from China to establish a branch campus in Malaysia. XMUM aspires to become a university with a distinct global outlook, featuring first-class teaching and research, and embracing cultural diversity.

The campus is located in Bandar Serenia, Sepang, Selangor Darul Ehsan. It is a 10-minute drive from the Kuala Lumpur International Airport, and a 15-minute drive from Putrajaya, the administrative center of the government of Malaysia.

Reputation and rankings 
Xiamen University has been consistently regarded as one of the top academic institutions in Southern China, with strengths in economics and management, fine arts, law, chemistry, journalism, communication, mathematics and political science. Among global university rankings, Xiamen University is ranked 422nd equal by the 2023 QS World University Rankings, 401-500th by the 2022 world university rankings of the Times Higher Education, 278th by the 2022 U.S. News & World Report (Best Global Universities Rankings) and 201-300th worldwide by the 2021 Academic Ranking of World Universities.

Faculties and research institutes

As of 1 September 2017, Xiamen University consisted of 20 schools with 44 departments, along with many key research institutes.
School of Humanities
School of Foreign Languages and Cultures
School of Journalism and Communication
School of Law
Tan Kah Kee College
Xiamen Academy of International Law
School of Public Affairs
School of Economics
Wang Yanan Institute for Studies in Economics
School of Management
College of Art
College of Chemistry and Chemical Engineering
School of Physics and Mechanical and Electrical Engineering
College of Oceanography and Environment
School of Life Science
School of Information Science and Technology
School of Electronic Science &Technology
School of Mathematics
Software School
Medical College
School of Architecture and Civil Engineering
Overseas Education College
Adult Education College
Professional Technical College
Internet Education College
School of Pharmaceutical Sciences

Notable alumni
Gregory Chow – economist
Chen Jingrun – mathematician
Lin Yutang – Chinese writer and inventor
Yu Guangzhong – Taiwanese writer, poet, educator, and critic
Xie Xide – president of Fudan University from 1983 to 1989
Lu Xun – writer
Raymond Lam – Hong Kong artiste and singer (enrolled for one year, 1996)
Faye Wong – singer
Wong Ker-lee – Fujianese Hong Kong businessman and politician
Zhang Gaoli – CCP Tianjin Committee Secretary and member of Politburo of the Chinese Communist Party
Li Wo-shi – magistrate of Kinmen County
Huang Wei – programmer
 Bei Cun - avant-garde Christian novelist.
 Tsai Chih-chan - poet and painter

See also
Xiamen University Malaysia
List of universities in China

References

External links

  

 
Universities and colleges in Fujian
Project 211
Plan 111
Educational institutions established in 1921
Medical schools in China
Universities in China with English-medium medical schools
1921 establishments in China
Vice-ministerial universities in China
Major National Historical and Cultural Sites in Fujian